Elise Maes (born 27 January 1992) is a Luxembourgian racing cyclist who most recently rode for British amateur team Weston Homes–Torelli–Assure–Fred Whitton.

Major results
Source: 

2014
 3rd Time trial, National Road Championships
2015
 National Road Championships
2nd Time trial
2nd Road race
2016
 3rd Time trial, National Road Championships
2017
 Games of the Small States of Europe
1st  Road race
1st  Team road race
2nd  Time trial
 National Road Championships
2nd Time trial
2nd Road race
2018
 National Road Championships
2nd Time trial
2nd Road race

See also
 List of 2016 UCI Women's Teams and riders

References

External links
 
 

1992 births
Living people
Luxembourgian female cyclists
Place of birth missing (living people)
European Games competitors for Luxembourg
Cyclists at the 2019 European Games